Larub may refer to:
 Larub, Kohgiluyeh
 Larub, Landeh